Museum Anthropology Review is a peer-reviewed gold open access academic journal focusing on research in material culture studies, museum-based scholarship, and the study of museums in society. In addition to anthropology, it covers the fields of folklore, art history, and museum studies. It was established in 2007 and is published for the Mathers Museum of World Cultures by the Indiana University Bloomington Libraries as part of its IUScholarWorks program using Open Journal Systems. The journal is edited by Jason Baird Jackson.

References 

Anthropology journals
English-language journals
Biannual journals
Open access journals
Publications established in 2007
Museology
Indiana University Press academic journals